You Made My Dawn is the sixth extended play by South Korean boy band Seventeen. It was released on January 21, 2019, through Pledis Entertainment. It debuted atop the Gaon Album Chart, Oricon Albums Chart and at number four on the US Billboard World Albums chart.

Background
Joshua said the title is a continuation of the theme of their previous EP, You Make My Day, in that "You made my darkness into dawn. [...] The sun comes in to make the night a little brighter and it progresses into day, right? That's why we tried to compare the flow of emotions to the sun."

Music
Tamar Herman of Billboard described "Home" as "sentimental future bass", while in the publication's prior list of the "10 Most Anticipated K-pop Albums of 2019", Jeff Benjamin described the first track released from the EP, "Getting Closer", as "dark hip-hop".

Track listing

Charts

Weekly charts

Year-end charts

Certifications and sales

Accolades

Music program awards

See also
 List of Gaon Album Chart number ones of 2019
 List of Oricon number-one albums of 2019

References

2019 EPs
Korean-language EPs
Seventeen (South Korean band) EPs
Hybe Corporation EPs